Russell Currier (born June 26, 1987) is a retired American biathlete.

Born in Stockholm, Maine, he competed for United States at the 2014 Winter Olympics in Sochi.

References

1987 births
Living people
American male biathletes
Biathletes at the 2014 Winter Olympics
Olympic biathletes of the United States
People from Aroostook County, Maine
Track and field athletes from Maine